Dmitriy Yakovlev is a Kazakhstani beach volleyball player. He competed at the 2012 Asian Beach Games in Haiyang, China.

References

External links
 

Living people
Year of birth missing (living people)
Kazakhstani beach volleyball players
Beach volleyball players at the 2010 Asian Games
Beach volleyball players at the 2014 Asian Games
Beach volleyball players at the 2018 Asian Games
Asian Games competitors for Kazakhstan